, better known for his stage name , is a Japanese comedian, narrator, actor, playwright, and lyricist. He is sometimes called .

Career
In 1995, while studying at the Japan Institute of the Moving Image, Masuno formed the comedy duo known as Bakarhythm with Toshihiro Matsushita. For the next 10 years, the duo had some success and appeared on a number of television variety and programs. In 2005, Matsushita decided to retire from the entertainment industry and the unit disbanded in November of that same year. Masuno decided to continue the activities of Bakarhythm by himself and took on the name as a solo comedian.

In 2006, just three months after the going solo, Bakarhythm became a finalist at the R-1 Grand Prix, the most prevalent televised comedy competition for solo performers. His flip board neta was a huge hit and landed him 4th place at the finals as well as propelling him to major success there afterward with the neta being featured in many commercials. However, Bakarhythm feared that the overuse of the same joke and gag may potentially lead to him becoming a one-hit wonder, and promptly stopped performing the flip board neta just one year after its initial break to popularity. He continued to appear on the R-1 Grand Prix consecutively for five years afterwards and was a finalist in four of the five years, and changing his performance with new material every time he entered. His neta, "Baka the Geography Teacher" scored a perfect 100 points at the 2009 R-1 Grand Prix, the first in the competition's history.

Bakarhythm began activities as a creator and screenwriter in 2012 with various television and comedy works. In 2014, he began activities as a screenwriter for serial TV dramas for the first time with Sutekinasen Taxi while appearing as an actor at the same time. Bakarhythm's career as a screenwriter then flourished as he was in charge of the script and screenwriting for prime time television dramas such as Kamoshiranai Joyu-tachi, Sakurazakabe Monogatari, the 2016 drama version of Ten Dark Women, Sumu Sumu (In which he also starred in), and Kaku OL Nikki (Also its original creator and lead actor). Bakarhythm won the Galaxy Award and the Kuniko Mukoda Award for Kaku OL Nikki in 2017.

In 2014, he appeared wearing a fake long nose and blonde wig in a controversial whiteface commercial for All Nippon Airways. In 2015, he appeared in almost all advertising for Super Mario Maker and designed a level that is playable in the game.

In December 2019, Bakarhythm married former idol and member of Denpagumi.inc, Nemu Yumemi.

Filmography

TV programmes

Current

Former

Drama

Films

Japanese dub

References

External links
 Official profile 
  

Japanese male comedians
Japanese male film actors
Japanese male television actors
Japanese male voice actors
1975 births
Living people
People from Tagawa, Fukuoka
Actors from Fukuoka Prefecture
20th-century comedians
21st-century comedians
21st-century Japanese male actors